El Tiradito is a shrine and popular local spot located at 420 South Main Avenue in the Old Barrio area of Downtown Tucson, Arizona. The shrine consists of the crumbling remains of a brick building, with a large metal rack for candles and desert plants now occupying the interior. Large, glass-encased candles, frequently depicting saints of the Roman Catholic Church are lit and left burning at the shrine, both on the stand and along the ledges of the building. Small slips of paper containing prayers or messages of thanks are also often pressed into cracks in the walls or left elsewhere at the shrine, as are other memorial objects. In addition to the faithful who leave these religious objects, El Tiradito is frequented and favored by many Tucsonans, including writers, poets, and other members of the town's artistic community.

According to the Phoenix New Times publication, El Tiradito is the only Catholic shrine in the United States dedicated to a sinner buried in unconsecrated ground. It is said that the man buried there died fighting for the love of a woman. Visitors to this area light candles for the man, hoping his soul will be freed from purgatory. Some of the nooks and crannies of El Tiradito even house the notes and letters of the heartbroken, prayers asking for healing of the heart.

El Tiradito was listed on the U.S. National Register of Historic Places in 1971.  It was documented in the Historic American Landscapes Survey in 2012.

It was described in 2021 as "a three-sided shrine of crumbling adobe walls, small and nondescript, mere streets away from the bustle and noise of downtown Tucson."

References

External links
 A photograph of the shrine
 El Tiradito Wishing Shrine in Tucson, US (YouTube)
 

Buildings and structures in Tucson, Arizona
Properties of religious function on the National Register of Historic Places in Arizona
Historic American Landscapes Survey in Arizona
Tourist attractions in Tucson, Arizona
National Register of Historic Places in Tucson, Arizona
Buildings and structures completed in 1871